Pseudotocinclus tietensis is a species of armored catfish endemic to Brazil where it occurs in many tributaries of the upper Tietê basin. It is found both in small creeks and medium size rivers such as the Paraitinga River, a tributary of the rio Tietê, where it lives grazing on semisubmersed overhanging plants. This species can be found attached to the grass along the river margin and in the middle of the river among rocks and pieces of wood in fast current water. This species grows to a length of  SL.

References
 

Otothyrinae
Fish of South America
Fish of Brazil
Endemic fauna of Brazil
Taxa named by Rodolpho von Ihering
Fish described in 1907